Lafuentemyia is a genus of parasitic flies in the family Tachinidae. There are at least two described species in Lafuentemyia.

Species
These two species belong to the genus Lafuentemyia:
 Lafuentemyia limbisquamum Aldrich, 1934
 Lafuentemyia yanezi Marnef, 1965

References

Further reading

 
 
 
 

Tachinidae
Articles created by Qbugbot